Hildersham Wood is a  biological Site of Special Scientific Interest south of Hildersham in Cambridgeshire.

The principal trees in this ancient wood, on wet chalky clay, are pedunculate oaks. The ground flora is diverse, including locally uncommon species such as  broad-leaved helleborine and sweet woodruff. There are a variety of mosses and ferns.

The site is private land with no public access.

References

Sites of Special Scientific Interest in Cambridgeshire